Wigan Rugby Union Football Club are a rugby union team based in Wigan, Greater Manchester, England. Founded in 1913, they are based at Douglas Valley on the far edges of the Haigh Estate. 

Wigan has produced talent that includes among others the late Mike Gregory, Joe Lydon and Andy Gregory who went on to forge careers at the top of rugby league, and the likes of Dave Cusani and many others who gained international and county honours at rugby union. In 2016/17, for the first time in the club's 104-year history they had mini, junior and colts teams playing in every age group, with an added bonus of an U5's and 6's training team. In total, mini and junior playing membership is now over 200, there are 30 qualified mini and junior volunteer coaches.

Wigan RUFC were the RFU Junior and Mini Section of the Year for 2017–18, and were awarded RFU Kids First Champion Club December 2017.

Club Honours
North West 1 champions: 1988–89
North West 3 champions: 1998–99

References

English rugby union teams
Rugby clubs established in 1913
Sport in Wigan
1913 establishments in England